Raj-Vithi Football Club (Thai: สโมสรฟุตบอลราชวิถี) is a defunct professional football club based in Bangkok, Thailand.
Founded in 1968, they won their first title in 1969, only one year after being founded.  Three more Championship titles followed, but their success was not repeated in more recent years.  In 2007 they finished in 5th place, and were relegated before the end of the 2008 season to the Thailand Division 2 League.

At the beginning of the 2009 season, Bangkok Bank FC withdrew from the league before the season began. The Thai Football Association therefore decided that to fill the place, they would run a pre-season competition featuring the four relegated clubs from the Thailand Division 1 League 2008 season. Raj Vithi were one of these clubs. Raj Vithi were beaten by Thai Honda FC in the semi-final 1–0.

In 2015, Raj Vithi took a year out of the competition and did not compete in the league.

Club Achievements
 Queen's Cup : Winner (1973)
 FA Cup : Winner (1974, 1975)
 Kor Royal Cup: Winner (1969, 1973, 1975, 1977)
 Khǒr Royal Cup: Winner (1995)
 Khor Royal Cup: Winner (1972)

Stadium and locations

Season By Season record

P = Played
W = Games won
D = Games drawn
L = Games lost
F = Goals for
A = Goals against
Pts = Points
Pos = Final position

QR1 = First Qualifying Round
QR2 = Second Qualifying Round
R1 = Round 1
R2 = Round 2
R3 = Round 3
R4 = Round 4

R5 = Round 5
R6 = Round 6
QF = Quarter-finals
SF = Semi-finals
RU = Runners-up
W = Winners

External links
 Official website
 Official Facebookpage

References

Association football clubs established in 1968
Association football clubs disestablished in 2015
Defunct football clubs in Thailand
Football clubs in Thailand
Sport in Bangkok
1968 establishments in Thailand
2015 disestablishments in Thailand